Another Game is the fifth studio album by P-Model.

Background
In March 1983, Yasumi Tanaka, P-Model's original keyboardist, left the group and the music industry entirely due to a severe case of writer's block. His departure left the band in a state of crisis, as leader Susumu Hirasawa was for the first time the only major creative force since the group's days as Mandrake.

Composition
With Hirasawa assuming full creative control of the band, Another Game songs reflected the signature mood that would be prevalent throughout his career. The album carries over the sensory experimentation of Perspective and their 1983 self-released album Fu Kyoka Kyoku Shū. Hirasawa uses atypical song structures, as well as those to affect the listener through biofeedback and alpha waves. Guitar and atmospheric synths are emphasized as opposed to the loud bass and drums of Perspective. The album also pays homage to Pink Floyd, whom Hirasawa drew deep inspiration from for his music.

Hirasawa described the concept underpinning the album thus:

Release
The album was originally scheduled to be released on 25 October 1983. However, the band's label Japan Record postponed it three times. A situation that deeply aggravated Hirasawa, to the point of going public:

Track listing

"Harm Harmonizer" contains a sample of "Two on a Floor" by P-Model, from the album Fu Kyoka Kyoku Shū.

The titles of the songs are officially rendered out in all caps, except for the sub-titles of the first and last songs. "Fu-Ru-He-He-He" has had its title rendered in hiragana and translated as "FuLu He He He" on various sources.

On vinyl issues, "Awakening Sleep〜α click" leads into a locked groove, so that the track would have an "endless" effect.

Personnel
P-Model - Production, Arrangements
Susumu Hirasawa - Vocals, Guitar, Synthesizer, Heavenizer
Sadatoshi Tainaka - Drums, Real Drum programming
Tatsuya Kikuchi - Bass, Backing vocals
Shunichi Miura - Keyboards, Piano, Backing vocals

Guest musicians & production
Toshinobu Kyozima - Voice on "Another Game step1"
Manami Takada - Backing vocals on "Mouth to Mouth"
Eiichi Tsutaki (courtesy of Floor Records) - Xylophone and Slit drum on "Floor"
Yasushi Konishi - Engineering
Toshiyuki Asakuno - Assistant Engineering

Staff
Shōzō Shiba - Direction
Yūichi Hirasawa (credited as "Yū1 Hirasawa") - Art director
Yōko Matsubara & Jaish (GIN-BAN) - Photography
Model House - Productive Management
Thanks to: Akiro "Kamio" Arishima, Ako (Zelda), Takashi Kokubo (Tsutomu Yamashita & Muse), TS STUDIO, Susumu Shigaki, Taro Yamamoto, Yuichi Yamaguchi

Release history

"Atom-Siberia" ("Malformed Area" version) is included on the Impossibles! 80's JAPANESE PUNK & NEW WAVE various artists compilation.

References
Notes

Citations

Bibliography

 .

External links
 ANOTHER GAME at NO ROOM - The official site of Susumu Hirasawa (P-MODEL)
 
 ANOTHER GAME at SS RECORDINGS Official Site

1984 albums
P-Model albums
Japanese-language albums